Ian Butler may refer to:

 Ian Butler (cricketer) (born 1981), New Zealand cricketer
 Ian Butler (footballer) (born 1944), English footballer
 Ian "Rocky" Butler (born 1979), Canadian football player
Ian Butler, former member of Tempest (Celtic rock band)